Pristimantis adnus is a species of frog in the family Strabomantidae. It is endemic to Panama and is only known from its type locality in Serranía del Sapo, Darién Province. The species was found while researchers were working on a way to save Panama's frogs from extinction from the deadly amphibian disease chytridiomycosis. The frog was collected in Panama's Darién Province in 2003 and described as a new species in 2010. The name of the species is a Latinized version of the Spanish term for DNA which is ADN.

Description
Pristimantis adnus is known from two males. Their dorsum was shagreen with some scattered enlarged granules. They were found in the leaf litter during the day at elevations of about  asl.

References

adnus
Endemic fauna of Panama
Amphibians of Panama
Amphibians described in 2010